Vincente Albán (1725 in Quito, Ecuador - Unknown ) was an Ecuadorian painter, member of the Quito School, noted for his idealized paintings of indigenous (Yumbo people) and Hispanic Criollos in their native outfits. These paintings depict a variety of social classes and associated clothing of the time. Exploring Colonial Hispanic-American culture, he was commissioned by José Celestino Mutis, who wanted to highlight the local society, flora and fruit. Alban painted his works by oil on canvas technique.

Such paintings of this era were often used as a method of showing South American territory and its bountiful resources. Albán portrayed people shown in his paintings as wearing gold and silver jewelry to demonstrate the continent's wealth.

Paintings and local fauna featured 

 Principal Lady with her Black Slave (1783) - Franadillas tree, Loquat tree, Large Coconut Palm, Coquitos de Chile tree.
 Principal Indian of Quito with gala dress (1783) - Machetonas and Berugillas tree, Guabas tree, Fagsos Fruit, Guayabas tree
 Yapanga of Quito in a suit that uses this kind of women who try to please (1783) - Capulic tree, Custard apple trees, Caymitos, Strawberries
 Yumbo Indian from the vicinity of Quito with their feather costumes and fangs of hunting animal that they wear when they are in gala (1783) - Banana tree, Lapaias tree, Pineapples, Strawberries
 India in gala dress (1783) - Avocado tree, Chilguacanes tree, Chamburos tree, Namey Fruit
 Yumbo Indian of Maynas with his load (1783) -  Pitahayas tree, Obo tree, Mamei tree, Pumpkin
 Portrait of the Bishop of Quito Blas Manuel Sobrino (1783)

Notable Exhibits 

 1780 - Possession of King Charles III of Spain
 ? - National Museum of Natural Sciences of Madrid
 ? - Ethnographic Section of the National Archaeological Museum of Madrid
 1941 - Museum of America of Madrid
 2018 - National Museum of Ecuador (90 days then returned to the Museum of America of Madrid)

Gallery

References 

1725 births
Year of death missing
Ecuadorian painters